Turritopsis lata is a species of hydrozoan of the family Oceaniidae.

References

Oceaniidae
Animals described in 1885